Umberto Bonadè (2 January 1909 in Piacenza – 1992) was an Italian rower who competed in the 1928 Summer Olympics.

In 1928 he was part of the Italian boat, which won the bronze medal in the coxless four event.

References

External links
 profile

1909 births
1992 deaths
Sportspeople from Piacenza
Italian male rowers
Olympic rowers of Italy
Rowers at the 1928 Summer Olympics
Olympic bronze medalists for Italy
Olympic medalists in rowing
Medalists at the 1928 Summer Olympics
European Rowing Championships medalists